The Puente Hills are a chain of hills, one of the lower Transverse Ranges, in an unincorporated area in eastern Los Angeles County, California, in the United States. The western end of the range is often referred to locally as the Whittier Hills.

Geography

The Puente Hills lie to the south of the San Gabriel Valley and the Pomona Freeway (State Route 60), to the east of the San Gabriel River Freeway (Interstate 605), to the north of Whittier Boulevard, and to the west of the city of Diamond Bar and Chino Hills. To its north are the City of Industry, Hacienda Heights, and Rowland Heights. To the south are Whittier, La Habra Heights, La Habra and Brea.  The Brea-Olinda Oil Field, discovered in 1880 and still producing in 2014, is in the southernmost portion of the hills adjacent to the city of Brea.

Flora

The Puente Hills are in the California chaparral and woodlands ecoregion of the California Floristic Province. The remnant California native plants here are in the chaparral and oak woodland plant communities, with stands of California native grasses. Vascular Plants of the Whittier Hills, a floristic study, was completed by Julie A. Schneider Ljubenkov and Timothy S. Ross (2001), and published in Crossosoma. It built on the work of Bob Muns.

Landmarks

Rio Hondo College is located at the foot of the western end of the hills, and the Puente Hills Landfill is nearby. Rose Hills Memorial Park occupies portions of the northern area. The highest point in the western hills is Workman Hill, named for the pioneer Workman family. The Puente Hills Mall is located north of the hills. Hsi Lai Temple in Hacienda Heights, the largest Buddhist temple and monastery in the western hemisphere, is located in the hills.

Parks
Puente Hills Native Habitat Preserve
Puente Hills is home to the Puente Hills Landfill, the country's largest landfill, which closed in 2013. The high-tech landfill has begun offering tours. The Puente Hills Landfill Native Habitat Preservation Authority directs the acquisition, restoration, and management of open space in the Puente Hills for preservation of the land to protect the biological diversity and provide opportunities for outdoor education and low-impact recreation, and scheduled hikes are offered.

Hellman Wilderness Park
Hellman Wilderness Park is located in the western Puente Hills ("Whittier Hills") with trailheads in Whittier. It is managed by the Puente Hills Habitat Preservation Authority. It has trails into native coastal sage scrub habitats, and up to vistas of the Los Angeles Basin.

Schabarum Regional Park
Schabarum Regional Park is partially in the eastern Puente Hills, in Rowland Heights, eastern Los Angeles County, California. It has equestrian and hiking trails in the hills.

Oil drilling

A commercial discovery was made in 1897, for what would become the Whittier Oil Field, when a well was drilled to a depth of 984 feet.  The location was in the central area of production.  By 1903, about 100 wells were in operation and by 1924, there were 163 commercial wells in operation.

There has been a long history of oil drilling in the Puente Hills.  In the early 20th century, several companies drilled, including Simon Murphy's Murphy Oil Company.  Recently, Matrix Oil has proposed resumption of oil drilling on several acres in the Puente Hills. Oil drilling began to decline in the Puente hills in the 1940s.

History and Legends

In the early 1930s an unsuccessful high-voltage experiment was made in an attempt to create rain.

A Robin Airlines Curtiss C-46 passenger plane crashed in the Puente Hills near Turnbull Canyon, killing all 29 passengers on April 16, 1952.

In the 1953 film adaptation of H. G. Wells' science-fiction novel The War of the Worlds, the Puente Hills was the location of an unsuccessful attempt to use a nuclear bomb against the Martian invaders.

It was one of the sites for Nike anti-aircraft missiles in the 1950s till the late 1960s.

In the scene from Back to the Future (1985 film), Doc Brown introduces the iconic Delorean time machine in the parking lot of Puente Hills Mall.

The October 1987 Whittier Narrows Earthquake revealed a previously unrecognized fault line under the Puente Hills Area.

It was the location of one of the largest landfills in the U.S. before shutting down in 2013.

Nearby ranges
Chino Hills
San Rafael Hills
San Gabriel Mountains
Santa Ana Mountains
Verdugo Mountains
Turnbull Canyon

See also
 Puente Hills Fault

References

External links 

 Puente Hills Preserve Park Map
 Puente Hills Preserve Park - activities and homepage
 The Puente Hills Preserve:  Puente - Chino Hills Wildlife Corridor
 The Puente Hills Preserve: Trails Access info.
 Puente Hills Landfill Native Habitat Preservation Authority
 Puente Hills Nature Blog (archives)

 
Hills of California
Transverse Ranges
Landforms of Los Angeles County, California